Morgan Island is a small island while also being the largest feature in a group of islands located  east of Cape Bidlingmaier, off the north side of Heard Island in the Indian Ocean. Morgan Island was surveyed in 1948 by the Australian National Antarctic Research Expeditions, who restricted the name Morgan as the largest feature in the group.

Black Rock lies immediately northwest of Morgan Island.

See also 
 List of antarctic and sub-antarctic islands
 Sunken Rock

References

Landforms of Heard Island and McDonald Islands
Subantarctic islands